Moon Sung-keun (born May 28, 1953) is a South Korean actor and politician. He has won three Blue Dragon Film Awards, two Baeksang Arts Awards, and two Chunsa Film Art Awards for Best Actor.

Career
Moon was born in Tokyo, Japan. His father was Rev. Moon Ik-hwan, who fought for democracy alongside Kim Dae-jung under the military regime led by Park Chung-hee in 1970s, and was a well-known pro-unification activist. After graduation from Sogang University with a bachelor's degree in trading, Moon worked as a salaryman for eight years.

In 1985, he began acting in theater, and became a key figure in the beginning of the renaissance of Daehangno stage plays in the mid-1980s, playing the leading role in such mega-hits as Chilsu and Mansu and Till the End of Time. Moon made his film debut in 1990 with Black Republic directed by Park Kwang-su.

During his acting career, Moon has won Best Actor award at the Blue Dragon Film Awards thrice, Baeksang Arts Awards twice, Chunsa Film Art Awards twice, and other accolades.

Moon started his political activities in 2009, becoming Democratic United Party's temporary chairman in 2012. Since then, he has mostly made special appearances in movies.

In 2017, Moon and a group of South Korean artists filed complaints against two former presidents Lee Myung-bak, Park Geun-hye, and other six senior officials, asking for a prosecution investigation over the allegation of an "artist blacklist."

Moon is a frequent collaborator of director Lee Chang-dong. He has starred in four of Lee's films, including critically acclaimed Burning (2018).

Filmography

Film

Television series

Awards and nominations

References

External links
 

 
 

 

1953 births
Male actors from Tokyo
20th-century South Korean male actors
21st-century South Korean male actors
South Korean male film actors
South Korean male television actors
South Korean male stage actors
South Korean politicians
South Korean male web series actors
Sogang University alumni
Living people
South Korean actor-politicians
Best New Actor Paeksang Arts Award (film) winners